An election of Members of the European Parliament representing Slovakia for the 2004–2009 term of the European Parliament was held on 13 June 2004 as part of the wider 2004 European election. The turnout was the lowest of any country in the European Union. Support was evenly distributed among five parties.

Main contesting parties

Results

Elected MPs
List of members of the European Parliament for Slovakia, 2004–2009

By slovak parties :

By European parliamentary group :

External links
Official results

Slovakia
European Parliament elections in Slovakia
2004 in Slovakia